Canadian Forces terms and expressions